The West Frisian languages are a group of closely related, though not mutually intelligible, Frisian languages of the Netherlands. Due to the marginalization of all but mainland West Frisian, they are often portrayed as dialects of a single language. (See that article for the history of the languages.)

Languages
Not all West Frisian varieties spoken in Dutch Friesland are mutually intelligible. The varieties on the islands are rather divergent, and Glottolog distinguishes four languages:
Hindeloopen Frisian (Dutch  and ), an archaic dialect of the peninsular harbour town of Hindeloopen and the village of Molkwerum on the west coast, is spoken by, at the most, some 300 people.
Schiermonnikoog Frisian , the most endangered West Frisian language, is spoken on the island of Schiermonnikoog by no more than 50–100 people (out of an island population of 900).
Westlauwers–Terschellings
Western Frisian, spoken by over 99% of the West Frisian-speaking population

References

Frisian languages
Languages of the Netherlands